Pyhäjärvi (Kymenlaakso) is a lake of Finland in the Kouvola Municipality in the region Kymenlaakso. It is a medium-sized lake in the Kymijoki main catchment area.  There are 39 lakes with this name in Finland. Pyhäjärvi is also the name of a municipality Pyhäjärvi in the region of Northern Ostrobothnia.. There is a Kimola canal from Pyhäjärvi to Konnivesi.

See also
List of lakes in Finland

References

Lakes of Kouvola
Lakes of Iitti